"Legends" is a song by American rapper Juice Wrld. It was released as the second single from his EP Too Soon.. on June 22, 2018, three days after the EP's release. The song is an homage to deceased rappers Lil Peep and XXXTentacion, the latter being a friend of Juice Wrld's.

Background 
The song is dedicated to Lil Peep, who died from a drug overdose in November 2017, and XXXTentacion, who was murdered a day prior to Too Soon..'s release.

After Juice Wrld died from a seizure in December 2019 at 21, he was alleged to have predicted his death with the following lyrics from "Legends": "What's the 27 Club? / We ain't making it past 21."

The song initially peaked at 65 in 2018. However, following Juice Wrld's death, the song reentered the chart and peaked at 29 on the US Hot 100 Billboard charts on December 20, 2019, the days following his death.

"Legends", alongside "Rich and Blind", the other song on the two-track EP they came from, were later added to Juice Wrld's second posthumous album Fighting Demons on March 18, 2022, alongside the newly released song "Sometimes".

Charts

Certifications

References 

2018 singles
2018 songs
Juice Wrld songs
Coincidence
Song recordings produced by Take a Daytrip
Songs written by Juice Wrld